Philip Collier (21 April 1873 – 18 October 1948) was an Australian politician who served as the 14th Premier of Western Australia from 1924 to 1930 and from 1933 to 1936. He was leader of the Labor Party from 1917 to 1936, and is Western Australia's longest-serving premier from that party.

Collier was born in Victoria and came to Western Australia to work in the mines. He became involved in the union movement on the Eastern Goldfields, and entered parliament at the 1905 state election, winning the seat of Boulder (which he retained for the rest of his life). In 1911, Collier became a minister in the government of John Scaddan. He replaced Scaddan as Labor leader in 1917, in the aftermath of the split over conscription, and became premier when Labor won the 1924 state election. Collier's government was returned to office three years later, but was defeated at the 1930 election. Nevertheless Collier continued to lead the state ALP, and regained the premiership after a Labor landslide in 1933, serving until his retirement in 1936.

As premier, Collier enjoyed a stability that had been absent from previous Labor administrations in Western Australia. His government was on good terms with trade unions, and its improvements to industrial arbitration laws have been credited with reducing the number of industrial disputes relative to other states. It also had various workers' rights enshrined in legislation, including a basic wage and a 40-hour week. Collier himself was a political moderate, and 
borrowed policies from his predecessors in certain areas, notably rural development. Later writers have praised his statesmanship and his skilled handling of his opponents, both inside and outside of his party.

Early life
Philip Collier was born at Woodstock near Melbourne, Victoria on 21 April 1873. The son of a farmer of the same name, he was educated locally but left school at the age of 16. He spent some time gold mining at Steiglitz, Victoria and then in New South Wales, and was later construction foreman of the Greater Melbourne Sewage Company at Northcote. On 27 June 1900, he married Ellen Heagney, with whom he had two sons and two daughters.

Collier began to take an interest in the labor movement, joining the Labor Party and becoming founding secretary of the Northcote branch of the Political Labor Council.  He was campaign director for at least three Labor candidates in State and Federal election, including Frank Anstey.

In 1904 Collier moved to Western Australia. He worked in the mines of the Perseverance Goldmining Company for around a year, becoming a member of the Boulder branch of the Amalgamated Workers' Association, and vice-president of the Goldfields Trades and Labour Council.

Politics
On 27 October 1905, Collier was elected to the Western Australian Legislative Assembly for the seat of Boulder. He retained the seat until his death nearly 43 years later. He was appointed Minister for Mines and Minister for Railways in the Scaddan Ministry on 7 October 1911, exchanging the Railways portfolio for Water Supplies on 23 November 1914.  He retained these portfolios until the defeat of the Scaddan government on 17 July 1916. In April the following year, Scaddan resigned from the Australian Labor Party in support of Billy Hughes's pro-conscriptionist stance, and on 9 May Collier was elected to take his place as Leader of the Labor Party and therefore Leader of the Opposition.

Collier retained the leadership of the Labor party throughout the Liberal and nationalist governments of Frank Wilson, Henry Lefroy, Hal Colebatch and James Mitchell. During this time Collier joined with John Curtin and J. J. Simons in leading an anti-conscription campaign. His public comments got him in trouble with censors a number of times, and on one occasion, in 1918, the magistrate of Kalgoorlie, William Walter, fined him with $25 under the War Precautions Act for making statements likely to discourage recruiting.

On 17 April 1924, the Labor party had a landslide election victory, and Collier became Premier, Treasurer and Minister for Forests. The Labor party was defeated by Mitchell in the election of 23 April 1930, whereupon Collier resumed as Leader of the Opposition. He won another term as Premier in the election of 24 April 1933. Simultaneously with the election, a referendum had been held in which the people of Western Australia had overwhelmingly voted in favour of secession from the Commonwealth of Australia. Although the Labor party opposed secession, Collier nonetheless agreed to act on the result of the referendum by petitioning the British government for secession.  The British government's refusal to act can be partly attributed to the fact that any action taken would have been in opposition to the new Government's wishes.

During Collier's time as premier, much was done to foster rural development. Construction of bridges, roads, and railways was accelerated, water supply in areas of agriculture was increased, and an Agricultural bank was set up, which provided generous loans to farmers. In addition, both the annual wheat harvest and the area under crop more than doubled, workers' compensation benefits and entitlements were increased, and industrial safety requirements were made more stringent. A state basic wage award was also introduced, together with regulations on the working conditions of timber workers, coal miners, and employees in other designated industries. In addition, although the Legislative Council rejected the introduction of a 44-hour workweek and preference to unionists, the Collier government was able to introduce both measures for most of its own employees through the use of administrative action.

Collier resigned as premier and leader of the Labor party on 19 August 1936, handing over to John Willcock. His 19-year term as parliamentary leader of the Australian Labor Party remains the longest ever, as does his 9-year term as Labor premier. Victor Courtney (1956) describes him as "the only person Labor [sic] produced in State politics who could fairly claim to have approached statesmanship". Mitchell and Collier are together credited with achieving an unusual degree of friendship and cooperation between parties during the 1920s and 1930s, which was most clearly demonstrated by Collier recommending Mitchell's appointment as Lieutenant-Governor in 1933.

Although no longer serving as a minister, Collier remained in parliament for a further twelve years, and was Father of the House from March 1939.  He died at Mount Lawley on 18 October 1948, and was buried in Karrakatta Cemetery. Collier Road in the north-eastern suburbs of Perth is named after Collier.

Notes

References

 Ross McMullin, The Light on the Hill: The Australian Labor Party 1891-1991

Further reading
The following sources were not used in the writing of this article:
 

1873 births
1948 deaths
Burials at Karrakatta Cemetery
Leaders of the Opposition in Western Australia
Members of the Western Australian Legislative Assembly
People from Victoria (Australia)
Premiers of Western Australia
Treasurers of Western Australia
Australian miners
Australian Labor Party members of the Parliament of Western Australia
Australian trade unionists
People from the City of Whittlesea